Bahlika (Sanskrit: बाह्लिक), also spelled as Vahlika, was the king of Bahlika kingdom. He was the elder brother of Shantanu, who was a king of Hastinapur and the uncle of Bhishma. He was the oldest warrior to fight in the Kurukshetra War. He had a son, Somadatta and a daughter Pauravi, and grandsons, Bhurishravas, Bhuri and Shala by his son and Avagaha and Nandaka were the grandsons by his daughter, Somadatta had a daughter who married the Kashi king Abhibhu, who along with him fought on the side of the Kaurava army in the Kurukshetra War. He was slain by Bhima on the 14th day of the war when it continued after sunset. According to Yudhishthira, Bahlika's only wish was that there should be peace among the Bhāratas. He is mentioned in the Hindu epic Mahabharata.

Kuru Prince and accession to the throne

Bahlika was the second of the three sons of Pratipa and his wife Sunanda, the king and queen of Hastinapur. With his eldest son Devapi set to inherit, Pratipa gifted some newly-conquered land (though in some versions of the story, this is the land Jarasandha gifted Bahlika for agreeing not to join Panchal in a war against Magdha) to his second son; the land was given the name Bahlika as a result. However, due to leprosy, Pratipa's eldest son Devapi refused to ascend the throne and retired into the woods to perform penance. Shantanu then became the crown prince and upon Pratipa's death became the king of Hastinapur, with Bahlika's blessing.

Before the Kurukshetra War

Bahlika is present at the Rangboomi where Kurus show the skills they had learned from Dronacharya and Kripacharya. He is also present at Yudhishthira's appointment as the crown prince. When Yudhishthira does the Rajasuya sacrifice in order to become an emperor, it is Nakula who extends a challenge/request to his great-grandfather's brother. Bahlika willingly accepted Yudhishthira's authority and attends the coronation, gifting him a chariot that was made from pure gold. Bahlika along with his family attended the game of dice between Duryodhana and Yudhishthira.

During the Kurukshetra War

Bahlika and his kingdom fought on the side of Duryodhana during the war. Bhishma considered him to be an Atirathi. On the first day, Bahlika fought against Dhrishtaketu. On the ninth day, Bhima destroyed Bahlika's chariot; however, he was saved by Laxmana. On the thirteenth day, he participated in the killing of Abhimanyu (he is not mentioned as an active participant, and is assumed to be a silent bystander). On the fourteenth day, he fought against the Upapandavas and Shikhandi, simultaneously, resisting them.

Death

On the fourteenth day of the war, Bahlika slew Senavindu. Afterwards, Satyaki battled Bahlika's son Somadatta and knocked him unconscious with his arrows. Furious, Bahlika rushed to his son's aid, only to be counter-checked by Bhima. Bahlika struck Bhima with a dart that made him delirious. Upon recovering his senses, Bhima hurled a mace at Bahlika's head, killing him.

The war would extinguish Bahlika's line. His only child and heir, Somadatta, as well as Somadatta's oldest son, Bhurishravas, were killed by Satyaki. In the Chatahurdi compilation, Bhurishravas's nine interpolated brothers die as well. Bhurishravas's two sons, Pratipa and Prajanya, were killed by Abhimanyu on the thirteenth day of the war.

References

Characters in the Mahabharata